San Juan Bautista District is one of fifteen districts of the Huamanga Province in Peru.

References